NHCS may refer to:
 National Heart Centre Singapore
 Nevis Historical and Conservation Society
 New Hanover County Schools